The first season of CSI: Cyber premiered on CBS on March 4, 2015, and concluded on May 13, 2015. The season, starring Patricia Arquette, aired in multiple time slots, but its regular time slot was Wednesdays at 10:00 pm (ET).

Plot 

The first season of Cyber follows the work of Mary Aiken inspired Special Agent in Charge Avery Ryan (Patricia Arquette), who leads an FBI division tasked with working on the dark web, investigating everything from online baby auctions ("Kidnapping 2.0"), to the disabling of roller-coaster safeguards ("CMND:\CRASH"), the world of black market weaponry ("Ghost in the Machine"), the death of those using a transport app ("Killer En Route"), and a design flaw in a printer ("Fire Code"). Focusing on the psychological aspects of computer forensics, Ryan uses her experience as a Ph.D. to get inside the mind of the subjects she pursues, battling bombings ("Crowd Sourced"), electronic crime scene tampering ("The Evil Twin"), cyber-bullying ("URL Interrupted"), pop-ups ("Click Your Poison"), planes ("L0m1s"), and bit coins ("Bit by Bit"), all with the knowledge that her own past threatens to put her, and her colleagues, at risk ("Selfie 2.0", "Family Secrets"). Ryan and her team, Elijah Mundo (James Van Der Beek), Daniel Krumitz (Charley Koontz), Raven Ramirez (Hayley Kiyoko), and Brody Nelson (Shad Moss), work under the watchful eye of Assistant Deputy Director Simon Sifter (Peter MacNicol), a shrewd career agent who built his career investigating gang violence and gun crime.

There is generally a jargon of the cyber world, with its explanation, that shows as subtitles right after the title of the series displays in each episode, except for the first episode of Season 1. It reveals that the story in the episode will be relative to this jargon.

Production 
On February 18, 2014, CBS announced plans to launch a new spin-off of the franchise titled CSI: Cyber. CBS announced that it officially picked up the series on May 10, 2014. On March 5, 2014, Patricia Arquette was cast as Special Agent Avery Ryan. Charlie Koontz was the next actor to be cast, playing a character then named Daniel Krumitz Peter MacNicol joined the cast on August 1, 2014, as Sifter, Van Der Beek was later cast as the male lead, in the role of Elijah Mundo. Shad Moss announced his casting on August 20, 2014, via his Instagram account. Kiyoko was cast on October 29, 2014. Peter MacNicol departed the main cast at the end of this season, The first season, of thirteen episodes, premiered in March 2015. The series is executive produced by creators Carol Mendelsohn, Anthony E. Zuiker, and Ann Donahue, former CSI: NY executive producer Pam Veasey (who acts as showrunner), Jonathan Littman, and Jerry Bruckheimer. Mary Aiken, on whom the show is based, is attached as a series producer.

Cast and characters

Main 
 Patricia Arquette as Avery Ryan, Ph.D.; a Special Agent in Charge and the head of the FBI's Cyber Crime Division
 James Van Der Beek as Elijah Mundo; a Senior FBI Field Agent 
 Peter MacNicol as Simon Sifter; an FBI Assistant Director
 Shad Moss as Brody Nelson; a former black-hat hacker turned analyst
 Charley Koontz as Daniel Krumitz; an FBI Special Agent and technical whiz
 Hayley Kiyoko as Raven Ramirez; a Social Media Trends expert

Recurring

Guest appearances

Episodes

Ratings

References 

2015 American television seasons
CSI: Cyber
Cyber 01